Secia may refer to:
 an alternative name for Secchia, a river in Italy
 a harvesting goddess associated with Tutelina